The White slave trade affair, also known as L’affaire de la traite des blanches, as De handel in blanke slavinnen and as Affaire des petite Anglaises, was a famous international scandal in Brussels in Belgium in 1880–1881.  It attracted international attention to the issue of sex trafficking and became the starting point of the international campaign against sex trafficking.

The case
In 1880, it was revealed that about fifty foreign girls had been sex trafficked illegally to work in brothels in Brussels. The case became a major scandal which attracted international infamy, especially since it became known that some people within the authorities had been involved in the trade. The scandal ended in both the mayor of Brussels as well as the head of the city's police force were forced to resign from their posts.

Aftermath
The White slave trade affair attracted international attention to the ongoing issue of sex trafficking. The intense press coverage resulted in public interest in the issue. It resulted in an international campaign against sex trafficking, which became labelled as white slave trade. Campaigns against sex trafficking first started in Belgium after the scandal of 1880, and spread from there to Great Britain in 1885, to France in 1902 and to the United States in 1907.

See also
 Zwi Migdal
 Sexual slavery
 Ashkenazum

References 

1880 in Belgium
1881 in Belgium
19th century in Brussels
Sex trafficking
Prostitution in Belgium
Scandals in Belgium
19th-century scandals